Halgabron (pronounced: Halgáybron; , meaning marsh of the carrion-crow) is a hamlet in the parish of Tintagel, Cornwall, England. Halgabron is east of Bossiney. The family of Robartes once held land at Halgabron. Halgabron mill was built on the Trevillet River in the 19th century. It is in the civil parish of Michaelstow

References

Hamlets in Cornwall
Tintagel